Margaret Elizabeth Farqhuar (born 1930) is a Scottish politician, the first woman to serve as Lord Provost of Aberdeen.

Born in Aberdeen as Margaret Burnett, she was educated at Ruthrieston Secondary School and then at Webster's College.  In 1948, she became a clerk at the North of Scotland College of Agriculture, and then with a hauliers' firm, before in 1951 marrying William Farquhar.

In 1971, Farqhuar was elected to Aberdeen District Council, representing the Northfield ward, as a member of the Scottish Labour Party.  She spent time serving on the council's planning committee, and representing the council on a variety of external committees.  From 1986, she also served as a director of the Aberdeen Citizens' Advice Bureau.  From 1994 to 1996, she was vice-chair of the council.

Farqhuar was elected to Aberdeen City Council in 1995, and the following year was elected as Lord Provost of Aberdeen, also serving as Lord Lieutenant of Aberdeen.  She was the first woman to become Lord Provost of the city.  She retired from the council in 1999, and that year was made a Commander of the Order of the British Empire.  She remains on the boards of several local organisations.

References

1930 births
Living people
Lord Provosts of Aberdeen
People from Aberdeen
Scottish Labour councillors
Women councillors in Scotland